Adkison refers to:

 Joseph B. Adkison (1892-1965), American Medal of Honor recipient
 Kathleen Gemberling Adkison (1917-2010), American woman artist
 Peter Adkison, American CEO